Zaw Win Shein (born 15 November 1978) is a Burmese businessperson best known for founding Ayeyar Hinthar Holdings, which acts as a business proxy for the Burmese military.

Early life and education 
Zaw Win Shein was born on 15 November 1978 in Hinthada Township, Irrawaddy Division, Burma (now Ayeyarwady Region, Myanmar).

Career 

Zaw Win Shein founded Ayeyar Hinthar Holdings, a local conglomerate, in 2006. The company's startup capital came from Tin Aung Myint Oo, a former military general and former Burmese vice president. The conglomerate is involved in Myanmar's agriculture, import/export, construction, trading, healthcare and banking industries. He also owns Ayeyawady United F.C.

In the aftermath of the 2021 Myanmar coup d'état, Ooreedoo announced its intent to divest in its Myanmar operations. In October 2022, Ooredoo finalised its sale to Nine Communications, which is closely connected with Ayeyar Hinthar Holdings. Ayeyar Hinthar Holdings serves as a business proxy for the Burmese military, including on major development projects like Y Complex. Zaw Win Shein also served on the board of directors for a subsidiary of 24 Hour Group, another local conglomerate. He also owns A Bank.

Personal life 
Zaw Win Shein is married to Shwe Yin Mar. His adoptive father, Soe Maung, is a retired major-general in the Burmese armed forces. Zaw Win Shein was previously romantically linked to Pan Phyu, a Burmese actress.

See also 
 Soe Maung

References 

1978 births
Living people
Burmese businesspeople
People from Ayeyarwady Region